Electrical energy is energy related to forces on electrically-charged particles and the movement of those particles (often electrons in wires, but not always). This energy is supplied by the combination of current and electric potential (often referred to as voltage because electric potential is measured in volts) that is delivered by a circuit (e.g., provided by an electric power utility). Motion (current) is not required; for example, if there is a voltage difference in combination with charged particles, such as static electricity or a charged capacitor, the moving electrical energy is typically converted to another form of energy (e.g., thermal, motion, sound, light, radio waves, etc.).

Electrical energy is usually sold by the kilowatt hour (1 kW·h = 3.6 MJ) which is the product of the  power in kilowatts multiplied by running time in hours.  Electric utilities measure energy using an electricity meter, which keeps a running total of the electric energy delivered to a customer.

Electric heating is an example of converting electrical energy into another form of energy, heat.  The simplest and most common type of electric heater uses electrical resistance to convert the energy.  There are many more complicated ways to use electrical energy.  In computers for example, tiny amounts of electrical energy are rapidly moving into, out of, and through millions of transistors, where the energy is both moving (current through a transistor) and non-moving (electric charge on the gate of a transistor which controls the current going through).

Electricity generation 

Electricity generation is the process of generating electrical energy from other forms of energy.

The fundamental principle of electricity generation was discovered during the 1820s and early 1830s by the British scientist Michael Faraday.  His basic method is still used today: electric current is generated by the movement of a loop of wire, or disc of copper between the poles of a magnet.

For electrical utilities, it is the first step in the delivery of electricity to consumers. The other processes, electricity transmission, distribution, and electrical energy storage and recovery using pumped-storage methods are normally carried out by the electric power industry.

Electricity is most often generated at a power station by electromechanical generators, primarily driven by heat engines fueled by chemical combustion or nuclear fission but also by other means such as the kinetic energy of flowing water and wind. There are many other technologies that can be and are used to generate electricity such as solar photovoltaics and geothermal power.

References 

Electricity
Forms of energy